Nancy Dalberg (July 6, 1881 – September 28, 1949) was a Danish composer.

Dalberg grew up on the Danish island of Funen (Fyn) where she learned to play the piano. Her father, a well-off industrialist, refused her wish to study at the Royal Conservatory in Copenhagen. In the end she took up composition because of medical issues that affected her arm. She had private composition lessons with Johan Svendsen, Fini Henriques and Carl Nielsen. Her output was not particularly large and most of her works were written between 1914 and 1935. Her compositions include around 40 songs, orchestral music and chamber works. She was the first Danish woman composer to write a symphony. It was premiered to critical acclaim although it was noted with surprise and perhaps a touch of condescension that Dalberg was a woman. The two strongest influences that can be heard in her music are those of Svendsen and Nielsen although she writes entirely with her own voice.

Her chamber music has received the most attention and one of her three string quartets, her Second String Quartet in G minor, Op.14 has entered the repertoire of many Scandinavian ensembles and was recorded on a Dacapo CD in 1999. (Dacapo 8.224138) The parts and score to this work were  republished by Edition Silvertrust in June 2007.

Wilhelm Altmann wrote of Dalberg's String Quartet No.2 (in Walter Willson Cobbett's Cyclopedic Survey of Chamber Music):

 “Nancy Dalberg published this work without giving her forename, and, had I not learned by chance that it was composed by a woman, considering also the austerity and native strength of her music, it would never have occurred to me that it was a woman speaking to us. Her mastery of the technique of composition is remarkable, and she has something definite to say.”

References
Bruland, Inge. "Dalberg, Nancy." Grove Music Online. Oxford Music Online. Oxford University Press, accessed May 4, 2015, http://www.oxfordmusiconline.com/subscriber/article/grove/music/46411.
Cobbett's Cyclopedic Survey of Chamber Music, Ed. W.W. Cobbett, Oxford University Press, London 1963
Jensen, Lisbeth Ahlgren. Notes to Dacapo Nancy Dalberg, CD 8.224138, Dacapo, Copenhagen, 1999

External links
Nancy Dalberg String Quartet No.2--sound-bites and short biography

1881 births
1949 deaths
Women classical composers
Danish classical composers
20th-century classical composers
Pupils of Carl Nielsen
Danish women composers
20th-century Danish composers
20th-century Danish musicians
20th-century women composers